Marcel Deelen (born 28 March 1994) is a German footballer who plays as a full-back for Vorwärts Epe.

Career
Deelen made his professional debut for Borussia Dortmund II in the 3. Liga on 2 October 2013, starting in the match against Darmstadt 98, which finished as a 1–1 home draw.

References

External links
 
 
 Viktoria Köln II statistics at Fussball.de 
 SC Wiedenbrück II statistics at Fussball.de 
 Vorwärts Epe statistics at Fussball.de 

1994 births
Living people
People from Borken (district)
Sportspeople from Münster (region)
Footballers from North Rhine-Westphalia
German footballers
Germany youth international footballers
Association football fullbacks
Borussia Dortmund II players
FC Viktoria Köln players
SC Wiedenbrück 2000 players
3. Liga players
Regionalliga players